Ahuntsic station is a former intercity railway station in the Ahuntsic-Cartierville borough of Montreal, Quebec, Canada. It was an unstaffed shelter that served as an optional stop for two Via Rail routes running from Montreal. It was located on Durham Avenue, near the Sauvé metro station; the RTM Mascouche commuter rail line stops at the Sauvé station nearby.

On July 3, 2017, Via Rail ceased serving Ahuntsic and L'Assomption stations, and began serving Sauvé and Anjou stations instead. Both new stations are commuter rail stations operated by the Réseau de transport métropolitain (RTM).

References

External links

Via Rail stations in Quebec
Railway stations in Montreal
Ahuntsic-Cartierville
Disused railway stations in Canada